The Gilbert Colburn House is a historic house at 110–112 Crescent Street in Waltham, Massachusetts.  The two-story wood-frame duplex was built c. 1870, and is a nearly intact example of an Italianate house built for Waltham Watch Company workers.  The main facade is symmetrical, with a pair of entrances at the center, each with its own ornate scrolled hood.  They are flanked by a pair of two-story projecting polygonal bays with apron panels.

The house was listed on the National Register of Historic Places in 1989.

See also
National Register of Historic Places listings in Waltham, Massachusetts

References

Houses in Waltham, Massachusetts
Houses on the National Register of Historic Places in Waltham, Massachusetts
Italianate architecture in Massachusetts
Houses completed in 1870